The Nur al-Din Madrasa is a funerary madrasa in Damascus, Syria. It is in the Suq al-Khayattin, inside the city walls. It was built in 1167 by Nūr ad-Dīn Zangī, atabeg of Syria, who is buried there. The complex includes a mosque, a madrasa, and the mausoleum of the founder. It was the first such complex to be built in Damascus.

The tomb-madrasa complex has two domes, first and the taller one is the oldest of the two and is over the tomb of Nur al-Din Zangi and the second, smaller muqarnas dome, similar to the dome of Nur al-Din's mausoleum belongs to the tomb of governor of Damascus Amir Djamal al-Din (d. 1269).

See also 
 Nur al-Din Bimaristan
 Jamal al-Din al-Ghaznawi
 History of medieval Arabic and Western European domes

References

Buildings and structures completed in 1167
12th-century mosques
Madrasas in Damascus
Mausoleums in Syria
Mosques in Damascus
Zengid mosques in Syria